An ecological or environmental crises occurs when changes to the environment of a species or population destabilizes its continued survival. Some of the important causes include:

 Degradation of an abiotic ecological factor (for example, increase of temperature, less significant rainfalls)
 Increased pressures from predation
 Rise in the number of individuals (i.e. overpopulation)

The evolutionary theory of punctuated equilibrium sees infrequent ecological crises as a potential driver of rapid evolution.

Because of the impact of humans on the natural environment in the recent geological period, the term ecological crisis is often applied to environmental issues caused by human civilizations such as: the climate crisis, biodiversity loss and plastic pollution which have emerged as major global challenges during the first few decades of the 21st century.

Examples

Crises caused by abiotic factors 
Climate change is starting to have major impacts on ecosystems. With global temperature rising, there is a decrease in snow-fall, and sea levels are rising. Ecosystems will change or evolve to cope with the increase in temperature.  Consequently, many species are being driven out of their habitats.

Polar bears are being threatened. They need ice for hunting seals, their primary prey. However, the ice caps are melting, making their hunting periods shorter each year. As a result, the polar bears are not developing enough fat for the winter; therefore, they are not able to reproduce at a healthy rate.

Fresh water and wetland ecosystems are dealing with extreme effects of the increase of temperature. The climate change could be devastating to salmon and trout and to other aquatic life. The increase in temperature will disrupt the current life patterns of the salmon and trout. The cold-water fish will eventually leave their natural geographical range to live in cooler waters by migrating to higher elevations.

While many species have been able to adapt to the new conditions by moving their range further towards the poles, other species are not as fortunate. The option to move is not available for polar bears and for some aquatic life.

Climate change

Biodiversity extinction

Animal overpopulation 

In the wilderness, the problem of animal overpopulation is solved by predators. Predators tend to look for signs of weakness in their prey, and therefore usually first eat the old or sick animals. This has the side effects of ensuring a strong stock among the survivors and controlling the population.

In the absence of predators, animal species are bound by the resources they can find in their environment, but this does not necessarily control overpopulation. In fact, an abundant supply of resources can produce a population boom that ends up with more individuals than the environment can support. In this case, starvation, thirst, and sometimes violent competition for scarce resources may effect a sharp reduction in population, and in a very short lapse, a population crash. Lemmings, as well as other less popular species of rodents, are known to have such cycles of rapid population growth and subsequent decrease.

In an ideal setting, when animal populations grow, so do the number of predators that feed on that particular animal. Animals that have birth defects or weak genes (such as the runt of the litter) also die off, unable to compete over food with stronger, healthier animals.

In reality, an animal that is not native to an environment may have advantages over the native ones, such being unsuitable for the local predators. If left uncontrolled, such an animal can quickly overpopulate and ultimately destroy its environment.

Examples of animal overpopulation caused by introduction of a foreign species abound.

In the Argentine Patagonia, for example, European species such as the trout and the deer were introduced into the local streams and forests, respectively, and quickly became a plague, competing with and sometimes driving away the local species of fish and ruminants.
In Australia, when rabbits were introduced (unwillingly) by European immigrants, they bred out of control and ate the plants that other native animals needed to survive. Farmers hunted the rabbits to reduce their population and prevent the damage the rabbits did to the crops. They also brought cats to guard against rabbits and rats. These cats created another problem, since they became predators of local species.

More examples 
Some common examples of ecological crises are:

 Deforestation and desertification, with disappearance of many species.
 Extinction events
 Permian-Triassic extinction event 250 million years ago
 Cretaceous–Paleogene extinction event 66 million years ago
 The Exxon Valdez oil spill off the coast of Alaska in 1989
 Global warming related to the Greenhouse effect. Warming could involve flooding of the Asian deltas (see also eco refugees), multiplication of extreme weather phenomena and changes in the  nature and quantity of the food resources (see Global warming and agriculture). See also international Kyoto Protocol.
 The nuclear meltdown at Chernobyl in 1986 caused the death of many people and animals from cancer, and caused mutations in a large number of animals and people. The area around the plant is now abandoned by humans because of the large amount of radiation generated by the meltdown. Twenty years after the accident, the animals have returned.
 Ozone layer depletion.
 Volcanic eruptions such as Mount St. Helens and the Tunguska and other impact events
Coral reef depletion
Acid rain
Ground water depletion
North Atlantic garbage patch

See also
 Agroecology
 Ecological collapse
 Global warming
 Human overpopulation
 Peak oil
 Collapse: How Societies Choose to Fail or Succeed

References

Further reading
 "Global Warming Said Devastating Aquatic Ecosystems" by Brad Bohlander
 "Death of a Small Planet" by Murray Bookchin
 "The Ecological Crisis as Part of the Present Multidimensional Crisis and Inclusive Democracy" by Takis Fotopoulos, (International Journal of Inclusive Democracy, vol 3, no 3, June 2007)
 "Myths on the Ecological Crisis" by Takis Fotopoulos
 "Polar Bears Send an 'SOS'" by WWF
 The Paradox of Wealth: Capitalism and Ecological Destruction by John Bellamy Foster and Brett Clark
 "Utilisation Competitions over Ecological Resources - Uncovering the Social Nature of the Environmental Problem (in: Progress in Industrial Ecology – An International Journal, Vol. 8, No. 4, 2014, pp.237–256)" by Andreas Metzner-Szigeth

Environmental issues
Evolution of the biosphere